Newcastle is a small village in Monmouthshire, south east Wales, United Kingdom.

History and amenities
Newcastle has a Norman motte-and-bailey castle site, from which it derives its name.  Its history is obscure, but it is believed to have been founded by Hugh de Lacy, lord of Ewyas in the 12th century, and in the reign of Edward III it belonged to the Huntley family.  The remains of the castle are on private land.  The bailey is defended by a banked ditch, but the oval motte and surrounding wet ditch have been damaged by farm buildings.  It commands extensive views to the west, towards the valley of the River Trothy.

Pool Farm, nearby, is described as "one of the most completely surviving cruck-trussed hall houses in the county", and is a Grade II listed building.

An ancient oak with a girth of  grew in the village, there was a well which had a reputation for holiness and remnants of an ancient fort. Another botanical highlight in the village was a wisteria which was one of the oldest examples of this plant in Britain and grew on the inn in the village which was renamed as the "Wellington Arms" after the Battle of Waterloo in 1815 when the wisteria was 150 years old.

References

Villages in Monmouthshire